The Hellenic Post S.A. (abbreviated ΕΛΤΑ, ELTA) is the state-owned provider of postal services in Greece. It succeeded the former government Postal Service, founded in 1828. ELTA provides a universal postal service to all parts of Greece and is a member of the Universal Postal Union. Services provided include, letter post; parcel service; deposit accounts; Swiftpost, a nationwide next-day delivery service; and the EMS international express mail service.

History
Hellenic Post was founded in 1828 along with the modern Greek state. Since 1996 it has been operating as a public limited company owned by the state.

In 1834 an agreement with French banker Feraldi ensure mail service to and from the islands, and in 1836 placed the first wagons for transporting mail between Athens and Piraeus.
In 1860 the Law on stamps came into force and the first stamp was printed in Paris Mint first Greek, symbolically the head of Hermes.

In 1869 the Greek postal board the train while in 1874 was member in the postal administrations who established the Universal Postal Union in Bern.
The 1892 telephony services were added to the responsibilities of the post.

In 1909 the company inaugurated the rural postal service. 1926 The Italian company Aeroespresso lifts for the first time the Greek post office.

During combat operations, the post office was always present, ensuring, enabling communication with the front. In 1949 with the establishment of OTE separated the three and postal undertake purely postal services.

Since 2006 the Post began offering Banking services which are provided in accordance with partnership with Hellenic Postbank.

See also
 Postage stamps and postal history of Greece

References

External links
  Official website

Greece
Postal system of Greece
Communications in Greece
Organizations established in 1828
Transport companies established in 1970
Greek brands
Philately of Greece
1828 establishments in Greece
Ioannis Kapodistrias
Government-owned companies of Greece